Patrick André Eugène Joseph Depailler (9 August 1944 – 1 August 1980) was a racing driver from France. He participated in 95 World Championship Formula One Grands Prix, debuting on 2 July 1972. He also participated in several non-championship Formula One races.

Depailler was born in Clermont-Ferrand, Puy-de-Dôme. As a child, he was inspired by Jean Behra. In Formula One, he joined a Tyrrell team that was beginning a long, slow decline, eventually moving to the erratic Ligier team before finally ending up with the revived Alfa Romeo squad in 1980. Depailler was helping to advance this team up the grid when he was killed in a crash at Hockenheim on 1 August 1980, during a private testing session. He was 35 years old at the time.

He won two races, secured one pole position, achieved 19 podiums, and scored a total of 141 championship points.

Sports cars and Formula Two
Depailler finished 0.9 seconds behind Peter Gethin in the 1972 Formula Two Pau Grand Prix. He battled Gethin closely
in a March 722 over the 70-lap course which curved through the French city. Both drivers lapped the field twice. Depailler came in 3rd in an April 1973 Formula Two race at the Nürburgring. He was driving a Ford Alpine. In May 1974 Depailler qualified his March in 1st position in qualifying for the Formula Two Pau Grand Prix.  In June he crashed his March 742 through a guard rail during time trials for a Formula Two race in Salzburgring. Depailler was uninjured but qualifying was stopped so that workmen could replace a section of railing which was torn off in the accident.

In April 1976 the Renault sports car team suspended Depailler for three races after he was involved in a crash which knocked out both his car and the Renault of teammate Jean-Pierre Jabouille. The incident occurred on the second turn, slightly more than a mile after the beginning of a  race at the Nürburgring. Depailler lost control and crashed, after which Jabouille also crashed while attempting to avoid his teammate. The drivers had been instructed not to contest the lead with each other. Depailler placed 2nd in the 1976 Swedish Formula One Grand Prix. He was 19 seconds behind winner Jody Scheckter.  Depailler drove in the
International Race of Champions event at Riverside International Raceway in September 1978. He was behind the wheel of the Paul Newman entered Spyder-Chevy in the October 1978 California Grand Prix.

Formula One

Tyrrell (1972–1978)
Tyrrell had given Depailler drives at France and Watkins Glen in 1972. Using one of the older cars, Depailler had finished in seventh place in the latter race. So in December 1973 Depailler was chosen with Scheckter to drive for Tyrrell, to replace the deceased François Cevert and retired Jackie Stewart. Depailler captured the pole for the 1974 Swedish Grand Prix, his 9th race as a Formula One driver. He negotiated the  Anderstorp course in a time of 1 minute, 24.758 seconds, for an average speed of 105.8 miles per hour. Depailler would finish 2nd in the race behind teammate Jody Scheckter; this proved his only podium of the year.

In January 1975 Depailler was given 25–1 odds of becoming the 1975 Formula One World Champion. He finished 5th in the 1975 Argentine Grand Prix in Buenos Aires. He took 3rd at Kyalami in the 1975 South African Grand Prix. Depailler stayed behind 2nd-place finisher, Carlos Reutemann, throughout the 78 laps of the event. On the first day of qualifying for the 1975 United States Grand Prix, Depailler crashed his Tyrrell into a catch fence at Watkins Glen. He was not injured.

Depailler came in 2nd in the 1976 Brazilian Grand Prix at Interlagos. Depailler gained a 3rd-place finish but drew the ire of rival James Hunt, who went out on the 4th lap. Hunt claimed that Depailler forced him off the track and shook his fist at him after his exit from the race. Depailler, who wrestled with brake trouble, claimed that he did not see the English driver in his mirrors. Depailler placed his six-wheeled Tyrrell in 3rd position for the start of the 1976 Monaco Grand Prix. The Tyrrells of Scheckter and Depailler were the only cars able to stay on the same lap with Lauda's Ferrari, who won from pole position. Depailler was 2nd to Hunt in the 1976 French Grand Prix at Le Castellet. Hunt held off a determined Depailler at Mosport Park in the 1976 Canadian Grand Prix. Both drivers were ill at the conclusion of the event, with Depailler having inhaled fumes over the last third of the race. He lost consciousness after pulling his car off at the first corner following the finish. He regained consciousness momentarily. Depailler finished 2nd ahead of Hunt (who nevertheless secured the 1976 Drivers' Championship by finishing third) at the 1976 Japanese Grand Prix, despite encountering tyre problems as the Fuji Speedway track dried from heavy rains.

He skidded off the Interlagos track at Sao Paulo during the 1977 Brazilian Grand Prix. He was hospitalized with a leg injury. Depailler qualified in the 6th row, 12th position, for the 1977 United States Grand Prix West.  In December 1977 Depailler was promoted to the number one driver for Tyrrell, when Ronnie Peterson left to drive for
Lotus. At the same time Tyrrell revealed that it was quitting its experiment with six-wheeled Formula One cars.

Depailler was 3rd in the 1978 Argentine Grand Prix in an Elf-Tyrrell.  Peterson passed Depailler on the last turn of the last lap at Kyalami, to claim the 1978 South African Grand Prix. Depailler's car was running short of fuel, allowing Peterson to erase a 9-second gap to win.
Depailler climbed from 12th starting place to end in 3rd position in the 1978 United States Grand Prix West. Depailler gained his first Formula One triumph by winning the 1978 Monaco Grand Prix.
Piloting a Tyrrell-Ford 008, Depailler secured the 36th annual event. It was his first victory in 69 championship races, although he had been 2nd eight times.

Ligier (1979)

Depailler switched to the Ligier team for 1979. The team began to field cars with V-8 Ford Cosworth engines, rather than the French-built Matra V-12 engines of 1978. Depailler led the first 10 laps before his engine experienced problems in the 1979 Argentine Grand Prix. He was forced to make a pit stop but managed a 4th-place finish.
Depailler came in 2nd to his victorious teammate, Jacques Laffite, in the 1979 Brazilian Grand Prix. Laffite was more than 5 seconds ahead at the end of the race. Depailler made contact with the fence at "Barbecue Bend" in the 1979 South African Grand Prix.

Ligier team manager, Gerard Ducarouge, said that the Ligier JS-11 had been in the planning stages for some time. The JS-9 had been tested as a "wing car" following the 1978 United States Grand Prix West, but the wind tunnel tests proved unsatisfactory. The JS-11 was built and tested in December 1978, with positive results. The V-8 engine was lighter and the Cosworth exhaust system was modified so that it sounded much the same as the old Matra engine's distinctive whine. The new body features of the JS-11 were revealed at the 1979 United States Grand Prix West.

Depailler posted a flag-to-flag win at Jarama in the 1979 Spanish Grand Prix. The win enabled him to tie Gilles Villeneuve in the standings for the Formula One world championship at the end of April, with 20 points each. Depailler posted a third position in qualifying for the 1979 Monaco Grand Prix on a staggered grid. Depailler was replaced in June 1979 by Ligier, after breaking both legs in a hang gliding incident on 3 June near his hometown of Clermont-Ferrand. His heel was also critically injured. The race team was receiving financial support from the French government, which specified that his replacement also be French; his replacement was the French-speaking Belgian veteran Jacky Ickx.

He had been healing well when he fell out of his hospital bed in early August, rebreaking one of the fractures. On 29 August, Depailler said that he was "resigned not to race again until next year", although he expected to leave his Paris hospital by the end of the week. He had undergone a number of operations on his legs, but had hopes to attend both autumn North American rounds, at Montreal and the Watkins Glen, as a spectator.

Alfa Romeo (1980)

In 1980, Depailler joined the newly formed Alfa Romeo team, that was on a comeback trail: Depailler had worked his way back from his hang-gliding accident the previous year, and had equipped his car with special brakes designed to toughen his leg muscles, he was still driving in pain by the time of his fatal accident and the car was fast (he qualified 3rd for the 1980 United States Grand Prix West) but not reliable enough to finish.

Death

Depailler suffered a fatal accident in testing at Hockenheim ten days prior to the 1980 German Grand Prix when a suspension failure pitched his car into the Armco barrier at the high-speed Ostkurve, inflicting fatal head injuries when the vehicle overturned and vaulted the barrier. The Alfa Romeo skidded along the top of the guard rail for several hundred feet prior to flipping onto its top.

Legacy
A radio-controlled car racing circuit is named in honour of Depailler at his home town. The Mini Circuit Patrick Depailler is one of the oldest tracks in France and was used to host an International Federation of Model Auto Racing (IFMAR) meeting in 1999.

As a result of his fatal accident, a new chicane was built into the Ostkurve at the Hockenheim circuit in order to slow the cars down - previously it had been a flat out curving right hander. The new Ostkurve Schikane was first used during the 1982 German Grand Prix.

Depailler was portrayed by Xavier Laurent in the 2013 film Rush, directed by Ron Howard.

Racing record

Career summary

 Graded drivers not eligible for European Formula Two Championship points

24 Hours of Le Mans results

Complete European Formula Two Championship results
(key) (Races in bold indicate pole position; races in italics indicate fastest lap)

 Graded drivers not eligible for European Formula Two Championship points

Complete Formula One World Championship results
(key) (Races in bold indicate pole position; results in italics indicate fastest lap)

References

French racing drivers
French Formula One drivers
Tyrrell Formula One drivers
Ligier Formula One drivers
Alfa Romeo Formula One drivers
Formula One race winners
European Formula Two Championship drivers
French Formula Three Championship drivers
24 Hours of Le Mans drivers
12 Hours of Reims drivers
World Sportscar Championship drivers
International Race of Champions drivers
Atlantic Championship drivers
French motorcycle racers
Racing drivers who died while racing
Sport deaths in Germany
Sportspeople from Clermont-Ferrand
1944 births
1980 deaths
BMW M drivers